Gary Victor (born 9 July 1958 in Port-au-Prince) is a Haitian writer, playwright, and scriptwriter for television and radio. His radio sketches and the uncompromising tone of his television series on the manners of the Haitian bourgeoisie provoked controversy and discussion. He also served as the General Secretary of the Senate of Haiti from 1996 to 2000.

Biography
Victor was born in Port-au-Prince and is the son of the sociologist René Victor. After studying agronomy, he worked as a civil servant at the Ministry of Planning and other ministries before becoming a journalist. He has become well known as a writer for radio, film and television. From 1976 to 1983, Gary Victor published short works of fiction in the state newspaper, Le Nouveau Monde, and subsequently, in the daily Le Nouvelliste, where he was a columnist from 1983 to 1990. He was editor of the daily Le Matin until June 2004.

Awards 
 2001: Ordre national du Mérite of France, All his work
 2003: Prix du Livre insulaire (fiction) à Ouessant, À l'angle des rues parallèles
 2004: Prix RFO du livre, Je sais quand Dieu vient se promener dans mon jardin
 2008: Prix littéraire des Caraïbes, Les cloches de la Brésilienne
 2012: Casa de las Américas Prize, Le sang et la mer

Works 
Novels
 Clair de Manbo, 1990
 Un octobre d'Élyaniz, 1996.
 La Piste des sortillèges, 1996 reprinted in 2002
 Le Diable dans un thé à la citronnelle, 1998 reprinted in 2005
 À l'angle des rues parallèles, 2000 reprinted in 2003
 Le Cercle des époux fidèles, 2002.
 Je sais quand Dieu vient se promener dans mon jardin, 2004.
 Dernières nouvelles du colonialisme, 2006
 Les Cloches de la Brésilienne, 2006.
 Nuit Albinos, 2007
 Banal oubli, 2008 
 Saison de porcs, 2009 
 Le sang et la mer, 2010 
 Soro, 2011.
 Maudite éducation, éditions Philippe Rey, 2012.
 Cures et châtiments, 2013
 Les Temps de la cruauté, 2017
 Masi, 2018
 Un homme dangereux, 2022

References

1958 births
Haitian essayists
Male essayists
Haitian journalists
20th-century Haitian novelists
Knights of the Ordre national du Mérite
Haitian male novelists
20th-century Haitian dramatists and playwrights
Haitian politicians
People from Port-au-Prince
Living people
21st-century Haitian novelists
20th-century male writers
21st-century male writers